Vinzenz Fischer (1729–1810)  was a historical painter and professor of architecture at the Academy of Vienna.

Life
Fischer was born at Schmidham, in Bavaria, on 3 April 1729. Following an initial artistic education in Passau, he entered the Vienna Academy as a student  in 1751. He made a journey to Italy in 1753–5, and, following his return to Vienna, was accepted as a member of the Academy in 1760. He had a great knowledge of architecture and geometry, and  held the post of professor of architecture at the Academy between 1764 and 1808. He died at Vienna on 26 October 1810.

Works
The following works by him are worthy of mention:
The Restoring of the Young Man of Nain to life, 1763.
The Raising of Lazarus, 1763.
Moses when a Boy treading on Pharaoh's Crown (in the Academy at Vienna).
Crucifixion, 1778 – Piarist church of the Finding of the Holy Cross, Litomyšl (copy after destroyed original by Francesco Trevisani).

References

Sources

 

1729 births
1810 deaths
People from Vöcklabruck District
18th-century Austrian painters
18th-century Austrian male artists
Austrian male painters
19th-century Austrian painters
19th-century Austrian male artists
Austrian architects
Academic staff of the Academy of Fine Arts Vienna